Song Jin-Kyu (born 12 July 1997) is a South Korean professional footballer, who plays as a midfielder for Bucheon FC in the K League 2. He previously played for Suwon Samsung Bluewings and Ansan Greeners.

Honours 
Suwon Bluewings
 Korean FA Cup: 2019

Gimpo Citizen
 K3 League: 2021

References

External links 
 
 

Living people
1997 births
South Korean footballers
Association football midfielders
Suwon Samsung Bluewings players
Ansan Greeners FC players
Place of birth missing (living people)
21st-century South Korean people